Romain Kalbris is a 1923 French silent adventure film directed by Georges Monca and starring Fabien Haziza, Catherine Fonteney and Jacqueline Passo. It is an adaptation of Hector Malot's 1869 novel of the same title.

Cast
 Fabien Haziza as Romain Kalbris
 Catherine Fonteney as Madame Kalbris
 Jacqueline Passo as Diélette
 Charlotte Barbier-Krauss
 Gabrielle Chalon
 Max Charlier
 Ferrat
 Fernand Godeau
 Georges Gorby
 Herman Grégoire
 Armand Numès
 Orvieres

References

Bibliography
 Philippe Rège. Encyclopedia of French Film Directors, Volume 1. Scarecrow Press, 2009.

External links 
 

1923 films
French silent films
1920s adventure drama films
1920s French-language films
Films directed by Georges Monca
French black-and-white films
French adventure drama films
Silent drama films
1920s French films